Kosher is food that may be consumed according to the Kashrut, or Jewish dietary laws.

Kosher may also refer to:
 Kosher (band), an American punk rock band formed in 1995 in Warrensburg, Missouri
 Kosher Gym, a fitness club on Coney Island Avenue in the Midwood section of Flatbush, Brooklyn

See also
Absolutely Kosher Records, a California-based record label
Chametz, the dietary laws of Passover
Kosher dill, a style of pickled cucumber
Kosher foods
Kosher locust, an insect considered kosher under Jewish dietary laws
Kosher restaurant, a restaurant or similar establishment specializing in kosher foods
Kosher salt, a form of coarse salt used for kashering
Kosher style, food made with a kosher appearance but without any claim to be kosher
Kosher tax, an urban legend and antisemitic conspiracy theory
Kosher wine
Koshur
Alternative Kosher, in Israel, obtaining a non-Chief Rabbinate Kosher certificate